Addisonia brophyi is a species of sea snail, a marine gastropod mollusk in the family Addisoniidae.

Description

Distribution
This species occurs in the Pacific Ocean off Santa Barbara, California, USA to Southern Baja California, Mexico.

References

 McLean, J. H. 1985. The Archaeogastropod family Addisoniidae Dall 1882: Life habit and review of species. Veliger 28: 99–108. 
 Turgeon, D.D., et al. 1998. Common and scientific names of aquatic invertebrates of the United States and Canada. American Fisheries Society Special Publication 26 page(s): 59

Addisoniidae
Gastropods described in 1985